Norman Vere Grace  (31 July 1894 – 20 February 1975) was an English first-class cricketer and Royal Navy officer.

A member of the famous cricketing Grace family, he was born to the Test cricketer E. M. Grace in July 1894 at Thornbury, Gloucestershire. He was educated at Wellington College, before joining the Royal Navy. He graduated from Britannia Royal Naval College in 1912, entering into service as a midshipman. Grace served in the navy during the First World War, during the latter stages of which he was promoted to the rank of lieutenant. Following the war he played first-class cricket for the Royal Navy against the British Army cricket team at Lord's in 1920, claiming five wickets on debut. Three years later in December 1923, he was promoted to the rank of lieutenant commander. He made two further first-class appearances for the Royal Navy against the Army in 1923 and 1927, though he took only a further two wickets in these matches. In July 1929, he was promoted to the rank of commander, before being promoted to the rank of captain in June 1937.

Grace served during the Second World War, captaining firstly the minelayer  from 1940–42, for which he was mentioned in dispatches, and later the heavy cruiser  between January–August 1944. From September 1944 to January 1946, he commanded  when it was based at Roedean School and oversaw its return to Portsmouth after the war. After relinquishing his command of Vernon, Grace was appointed as a naval aide-de-camp to George VI in February 1946. Four months later he retired from active service. He later served as a deputy lieutenant for Gloucestershire in 1960. Grace died in February 1975 at Amberley, Gloucestershire. He had married Lilla Marguerite Spiller in County Cork in 1932, with the couple having two sons.

References

External links

1894 births
1975 deaths
People from Thornbury, Gloucestershire
People educated at Wellington College, Berkshire
Royal Navy officers of World War I
English cricketers
Royal Navy cricketers
Royal Navy officers of World War II
Deputy Lieutenants of Gloucestershire
Norman